Oxytocin/neurophysin I prepropeptide is a protein that in humans is encoded by the OXT gene.

Function

This gene encodes a precursor protein that is processed to produce oxytocin and neurophysin I. Oxytocin is a posterior pituitary hormone that is synthesized as an inactive precursor in the hypothalamus along with its carrier protein neurophysin I. Together with neurophysin, it is packaged into neurosecretory vesicles and transported axonally to the nerve endings in the neurohypophysis, where it is either stored or secreted into the bloodstream. The precursor seems to be activated while it is being transported along the axon to the posterior pituitary. This hormone contracts smooth muscle during parturition and lactation. It is also involved in cognition, tolerance, adaptation, and complex sexual and maternal behavior, as well as in the regulation of water excretion and cardiovascular functions. [provided by RefSeq, Dec 2013].

References

Further reading